Lydia Gail Hall (born 14 December 1987) is a Welsh professional golfer and currently plays on the Ladies European Tour. In 2012, she won the ISPS Handa Ladies British Masters, her first Ladies European Tour win. In 2016, she won the Welsh National PGA Championship, the first  woman to win a PGA national tournament. She is the daughter of Wayne Hall, a rugby union player, who played one match for Wales in 1988.

Professional wins (4)

Ladies European Tour (1)
2012 ISPS Handa Ladies British Masters

LET Access Series wins (1)
2017 WPGA International Challenge

WPGA Tour of Australasia wins (1)
2022 TPS Victoria

Other wins (1)
2016 Welsh National PGA Championship

Team appearances
Amateur
European Girls' Team Championship (representing Wales): 2003
European Lady Junior's Team Championship (representing Wales): 2004, 2006
European Ladies' Team Championship (representing Wales): 2005, 2007

References

External links

Welsh female golfers
Ladies European Tour golfers
1987 births
Living people